
Gmina Gniewino is a rural gmina (administrative district) in Wejherowo County, Pomeranian Voivodeship, in northern Poland.

Villages
Gmina Gniewino contains the villages and settlements of Alpy, Bychówko, Bychowo, Chynowie, Chynowiec, Czymanowo, Dąbrówka, Dębina, Gniewinko, Gniewino, Jęczewo, Kolkowo, Kostkowo, Łęczyn Dolny, Lisewo, Mierzynko, Mierzyno, Nadole, Nowy Młot, Opalino, Perlinko, Perlino, Płaczewo, Rybienko, Rybno, Rybska Karczma, Salinko, Salino, Słuszewo, Strzebielinek, Strzebielinko, Tadzino and Toliszczek.

Neighbouring gminas
Gmina Gniewino is bordered by the gminas of Choczewo, Krokowa, Łęczyce, Luzino and Wejherowo.

References
Polish official population figures 2006

Gniewino
Wejherowo County